Vincent Mutale (born 28 April 1973) is a Zambian footballer. He played in 28 matches for the Zambia national football team from 1995 to 1997. He was also named in Zambia's squad for the 1996 African Cup of Nations tournament.

References

1973 births
Living people
Zambian footballers
Zambia international footballers
1996 African Cup of Nations players
Association football midfielders
People from Mufulira